Vernon Crawford (Jack) Cooke (December 6, 1936 – December 1, 2009) was a bluegrass music vocalist and instrumentalist, known for playing the guitar and bass with artists such as Bill Monroe and Ralph Stanley and the Clinch Mountain Boys. He was one of nine siblings (four brothers and four sisters) and was a native of Norton, Virginia.

Cooke was a cousin to old-time musician Dock Boggs, and Cooke’s father also played clawhammer banjo. He began playing guitar as a teenager and performed with his brothers and fiddler Kenny Baker as the Cooke Brothers before joining Carter and Ralph Stanley on bass.  Between 1955-57 he worked with the brother duo on the radio show Farm and Fun Time on WCYB in Bristol, TN. In 1958 he joined Bill Monroe’s band, playing off and on for a period of four years. During his stint as a Blue Grass Boy, he played both guitar and bass although his main instrument was guitar.

After leaving Bill Monroe, he formed his own group, the Virginia Mountain Boys, including Del McCoury on banjo. In 1970, Cooke joined Ralph Stanley and the Clinch Mountain Boys when he was reoffered a bass playing job after running into Stanley at a Norton, VA flea market.

Cooke worked regularly as a member of Ralph Stanley’s band until 2009, when he stopped performing on the road due to health problems. In 2002, he shared a Grammy for his work on the Ralph Stanley’s Lost in the Lonesome Pines project. During his tenure with the Clinch Mountain Boys, he released one solo album, “Sittin' On Top Of The World," in 2007.

He served half a term as mayor of Norton, VA during 1963.

In 2003 he received the International Bluegrass Music Association (IBMA) Distinguished Achievement Award.

On December 1, 2009, Cooke collapsed at his home in Norton, Virginia, after suffering a massive heart attack, at the age of 72. He was pronounced dead at the hospital.

References

External links 
 "Jack Cooke obituary – The Guardian". December 15, 2009, "Bass player and key figure in the US bluegrass scene"

1936 births
2009 deaths
20th-century American musicians
People from Norton, Virginia
Bluegrass musicians from Virginia